Trachylepis gonwouoi, also known commonly as Gonwouo's skink, is a species of lizard in the family Scincidae. The species is indigenous to the western coast of Central Africa.

Etymology
The specific name, gonwouoi, is in honor of Cameroonian herpetologist LeGrand Gonwouo.

Geographic range
T. gonwouoi is found in Cameroon and Republic of the Congo.

Description

Reproduction
The mode of reproduction of T. gonwouoi is unknown.

References

Further reading
Allen KE, Tapondjou WP, Greenbaum E, Welton LJ, Bauer AM (2019). "High levels of hidden phylogenetic structure within Central and West African Trachylepis skinks". Salamandra 55 (4): 231–241.
Allen KE, Tapondjou WP, Welton LJ, Bauer AM (2017). "A new species of Trachylepis (Squamata: Scincidae) from Central Africa and a key to the Trachylepis of West and Central Africa". Zootaxa 4268 (2): 255–269. (Trachylepis gonwouoi, new species).

Trachylepis
Reptiles described in 2017